Sollenau is a municipality in the Wiener Neustadt-Land District, Lower Austria, Austria. Sollenau is situated on the river Piesting. 4.03% of the municipality is forested. It is 10 km north of Wiener Neustadt and 36 km south of Vienna.

Population

History
Sollenau was first mentioned in 1166. It is one of the oldest settlements in the Steinfeld region of Lower Austria.

Economy
In 2001 there were 191 non-agriculture-related jobs in the municipality, and 2,055 persons were employed. The activity rate was 45,92%. In 1999 there were 27 agricultural or forestry related companies.

References

External links
 Pfarre Sollenau - Laurentius (in German)

Cities and towns in Wiener Neustadt-Land District